Voice-over (also known as off-camera or off-stage commentary) is a production technique where a voice—that is not part of the narrative (non-diegetic)—is used in a radio, television production, filmmaking, theatre, or other presentations. The voice-over is read from a script and may be spoken by someone who appears elsewhere in the production or by a specialist voice actor. Synchronous dialogue, where the voice-over is narrating the action that is taking place at the same time, remains the most common technique in voice-overs. Asynchronous, however, is also used in cinema. It is usually prerecorded and placed over the top of a film or video and commonly used in documentaries or news reports to explain information.

Voice-overs are used in video games and on-hold messages, as well as for announcements and information at events and tourist destinations. It may also be read live for events such as award presentations. Voice-over is added in addition to any existing dialogue and is not to be confused with voice acting or the process of replacing dialogue with a translated version, the latter of which is called dubbing or revoicing.

History

Career in Voice-over 
To become a voice actor, no training is required. The important factors to being a voice actor are technique, genres, and work. It is recommended to hire an acting coach and voice coach to help hone skills for recording a voice-over. There are many pieces of equipment that are also required to start a career in voice-overs. A computer, professional microphone, and an editing program, along with a studio to set up in, are all requirements to develop a professional voice-over. Careers in voice-over often allow people to work at home. To audition for a voice-over role, people often record a demo-reel. A demo-reel is a compilation of someone's works in voice acting. A demo-reel is very important to have for someone looking for a job in voice acting because many auditions ask for one. To find casting auditions, there are many online websites that can allow people to sign up for auditions. For an audition, people should warm up and try to arrive early so they can prepare and have the best chance at getting the role. The audition is begun with slating. Slating is a practice where the person going for the audition states their name and then says Take 1, Take 2, Take 3. After slating, the auditionee then reads the copy given to them by the casting team.

Techniques

Character device
In Herman Melville's Moby Dick (1956), Ishmael (Richard Basehart) narrates the story, and he sometimes comments on the action in voice-over, as does Joe Gillis (William Holden) in Sunset Boulevard (1950) and Eric Erickson (William Holden) in The Counterfeit Traitor (1962); adult Pip (John Mills) in Great Expectations (1946) and Michael York in its 1974 television remake.

Voice-over technique is likewise used to give voices and personalities to animated characters. Noteworthy and versatile voice actors include Mel Blanc, Daws Butler, Don Messick, Paul Frees, and June Foray.

Charactering techniques in voice-overs are used to give personalities and voice to fictional characters. There has been some controversy with charactering techniques in voice-overs, particularly with white radio entertainers who would mimic black speech patterns. Radio made this racial mockery easier to get away with because it was a non-confrontational platform to freely express anything the broadcasters found fit. It also became the ideal medium for voice impersonations. Characterization has always been popular in culture and all forms of media.  In the late 1920s, radio started to stray away from reporting exclusively on musicals and sporting events; instead, radio began to create serial talk shows as well as shows with fictional story lines. The technique of characterization can be a creative outlet to expand on film and radio, but it must be done carefully.

Creative device
In film, the filmmaker distributes the sound of a human voice (or voices) over images shown on the screen that may or may not be related to the words that are being spoken. Consequently, voice-overs are sometimes used to create ironic counterpoint. Also, sometimes they can be random voices not directly connected to the people seen on the screen. In works of fiction, the voice-over is often by a character reflecting on his or her past, or by a person external to the story who usually has a more complete knowledge of the events in the film than the other characters.

Voice-overs are often used to create the effect of storytelling by a character/omniscient narrator. For example, in The Usual Suspects, the character of Roger "Verbal" Kint has voice-over segments as he is recounting details of a crime. Classic voice-overs in cinema history can be heard in Citizen Kane and The Naked City.

Sometimes, voice-over can be used to aid continuity in edited versions of films, in order for the audience to gain a better understanding of what has gone on between scenes. This was done when the film Joan of Arc (1948) starring Ingrid Bergman turned out to be far from the box-office and critical hit that was expected and it was edited down from 145 minutes to 100 minutes for its second run in theaters. The edited version, which circulated for years, used narration to conceal the fact that large chunks of the film had been cut out. In the full-length version, restored in 1998 and released on DVD in 2004, the voice-over narration is heard only at the beginning of the film.

Film noir is especially associated with the voice-over technique. The golden age of first-person narration was during the 1940s. Film noir typically used male voice-over narration but there are a few rare female voice-overs.

In radio, voice-overs are an integral part of the creation of the radio program. The voice-over artist might be used to entice listeners of the station name or as characters to enhance or develop show content. During the 1980s, the British broadcasters Steve Wright and Kenny Everett used voice-over artists to create a virtual "posse" or studio crew who contributed to the programmes. It is believed that this principle was in play long before that time. The American radio broadcaster Howard Stern has also used voice-overs in this way.

Educational or descriptive device
The voice-over has many applications in non-fiction as well. Television news is often presented as a series of video clips of newsworthy events, with voice-over by the reporters describing the significance of the scenes being presented; these are interspersed with straight video of the news anchors describing stories for which video is not shown.

Television networks such as The History Channel and the Discovery Channel make extensive use of voice-overs. On NBC, the television show Starting Over used Sylvia Villagran as the voice-over narrator to tell a story.

Live sports broadcasts are usually shown as extensive voice-overs by sports commentators over video of the sporting event.

Game shows formerly made extensive use of voice-overs to introduce contestants and describe available or awarded prizes, but this technique has diminished as shows have moved toward predominantly cash prizes. The most prolific have included Don Pardo, Johnny Olson, John Harlan, Jay Stewart, Gene Wood and Johnny Gilbert.

Voice-over commentary by a leading critic, historian, or by the production personnel themselves is often a prominent feature of the release of feature films or documentaries on DVDs.

Commercial device
The commercial use of voice-over in television advertising has been popular since the beginning of radio broadcasting.

In the early years, before effective sound recording and mixing, announcements were produced "live" and at-once in a studio with the entire cast, crew and, usually, orchestra. A corporate sponsor hired a producer, who hired writers and voice actors to perform comedy or drama.

Manufacturers will often use a distinctive voice to help them with brand messaging, often retaining talent to a long-term exclusive contract.

The industry expanded very rapidly with the advent of television in the 1950s, and the age of highly produced serial radio shows ended. The ability to record high-quality sound on magnetic tape also created opportunities. Digital recording, thanks to the proliferation of PCs, smartphones (iOS and Android 5.0+), dedicated recording devices, free or inexpensive recording and editing software, and USB microphones of reasonable quality, and the increasing use of home studios, has revolutionized the industry.

The sound recording industry uses the term "presence" as the standard of a good quality voice-over and is used for commercial purposes in particular. The term "presence" measures the legitimacy of how a voice sounds, specifically one of a voice-over. Advances in technology for sound recording have helped voice-overs reach that standard. These technological advances have increasingly diminished "the noise of the system...and thus reducing the distance perceived between the object and its representation."

Translation

In some countries, such as Russia, Ukraine and Poland, voice-over provided by an artist is commonly used on television programs as a language localization technique, as an alternative to full dub localization.

In Bulgaria, multiple voice-over is also common, but each film (or episode) is normally voiced by three to six actors. The voice artists try to match the original voice and preserve the intonation. The main reason for the use of this type of translation is that unlike synchronized voice translation, it takes a relatively short time to produce, since there is no need to synchronize the voices with the character's lip movements, which is compensated by the quieted original audio. When there is no speaking in the film for some time, the original sound is turned up. Recently, as more films are distributed with separate voice and noises-and-music tracks, some voice-over translations in Bulgaria are produced by only turning down the voice track, in this way not affecting the other sounds. One actor always reads the translation crew's names over the show's ending credits (except for when there is dialogue over the credits).

See also
 Bumper (broadcasting)
 Bumper music
 Cinéma vérité
 Direct cinema
 I Know That Voice, a documentary film about American voice acting
 National Audio Theatre Festival
 Offscreen
 Voice acting
 Dubbing (filmmaking)

References

Film production
Television terminology
Radio broadcasting
Film and video terminology